Central University of Jammu is a Central University in the Samba district of Jammu, Jammu and Kashmir, India. It was established through an Act of Parliament: "The Central Universities Act, 2009" by Govt. of India. It started functioning from 2011. Dr. Sudhir Singh Bloeria was first Vice Chancellor of the university.

History 

The Central University of Jammu came into existence on 8 August 2011, with the appointment of  the first Vice-Chancellor. It was established by the Central Universities Act, 2009 (Act No.25 of 2009 read with the Central Universities Act, 2009).

The first academic session (2011-2012) commenced with three Post Graduate courses in English, Economics and Applied Mathematics at Temporary Academic Block-I (TAB-I) at Sidhra bypass road, Jammu. In the next academic session (2012-2013), five PG Courses were added: Computer Science, Educational Studies, Environmental Sciences, Human Resource Management and Travel & Tourism Management in Temporary Academic Block (TAB-II) at Sainik Colony Extension. Since the third session (2013-2014) all the departments are functioning from TAB at Sainik Colony. Four new post graduate courses were introduced in the academic session (2014-2015): National Security Studies; Public Policy & Public Administration; Social Work and Mass Communication & New Media. The University also offers Integrated M-Phil-Ph.D programme in eight subjects.

Campus
The University carries out its administrative functions from its head office at Bagla, Rahya-Suchani, District. Samba.

The Central University of Jammu campus is under construction at Village Bagla, Raya Suchani in District Samba, which is at an approximate distance of 30 kms from Jammu and 70 kms from Kathua respectively.

Organisation and administration

Governance
The President of India is the Visitor of the University. The Chancellor is the ceremonial head of the university while the executive powers rest with the Vice-chancellor. The Court, the Executive Council, the Academic Council, the Board of studies and the Finance Committee are the administrative authorities of the University.

The University Court is the supreme authority of the University and has the power to review, the broad policies and programmes of the University and to suggest measures for the improvement and development of the University; The Executive Council is the highest executive body of the University. The Academic Council is the highest academic body of the University and is responsible for the  co-ordination and exercising general supervision over the academic policies of the University. It has the right to advise the Executive Council on all academic matters. The Finance Committee is responsible for recommending financial policies, goals, and budgets.

Schools and Centres 
School of Business Studies
 Department of Human Resource Management & Organizational Behaviour
 Department of Tourism and Travel Management
 Department of Marketing and Supply Chain Management
 Department of Retail Management
 Department of Banking and Finance 

School of Basic and Applied Sciences
 Department of Mathematics
 Department of Computer Science and Information Technology
 Department of Physics and Astronomical Sciences
 Department of Chemistry and Chemical Sciences
 Department of Nano Science and Material

School of Education
 Department of Educational Studies
 School of Humanities and Social Sciences
 Department of Economics
 Department of Public Policy and Public Administration
 Department of Sociology and Social work
 Centre for Comparative Religion and Civilization

School of Languages
 Department of English
 Department of Hindi & Other Indian Languages

School of Life Sciences
 Department of Environmental Sciences
 Department of Animal Sciences and Wild Life
 Department of Plant Sciences
 Centre for Molecular Biology

School of National Security Studies
 Department of National Security Studies
 School of Knowledge Management, Information and Media Studies
 Department of Mass Communication and New Media

Academics 
The university offers UG, PG & research oriented programmes(PhD).

See also
 Central University of Kashmir
 Central University of Punjab
 Central University of Bihar

References

External links
 Official website

Central universities in India
Universities in Jammu and Kashmir
Education in Jammu (city)
Educational institutions established in 2009
2009 establishments in Jammu and Kashmir
Universities and colleges in Jammu and Kashmir